Yuri Mikhailovich Steklov (born Ovshey Moiseyevich Nakhamkis; ; , in Odessa - 15 September 1941, in Saratov) was a Russian revolutionary, Soviet politician, journalist, editor and historian. 

Steklov joined the Bolshevik faction of the Russian Social Democratic Labour Party in 1903 and became editor of Izvestia of the Petrograd Soviet after the Russian Revolution.<ref>Joseph Nedava, Trotsky and the Jews', Jewish Publication Society of America, 1972, p. 255</ref>  He wrote biographies of Mikhail Bakunin and Alexander Herzen, as well as commentary on Karl Marx and Vladimir Lenin. 

Steklov was arrested in February 1938 amid the Great Purge. After the outbreak of World War II on the Eastern Front, he was transferred to the Saratov prison where he died on September 15, 1941 from dysentery and extreme exhaustion at the age of 68. He was posthumously rehabilitated in 1956.

Works
 Michael Bakunin: ein Lebensbild, Stuttgart: J.H.W. Dietz, 1913
 A. J. Herzen: eine Biographie, Berlin: A. Seehof, 1920.
 History of the first International'', London: M. Lawrence, [1928]. Translated by Cedar and Eden Paul from the 3rd Russian ed., with notes from the 4th ed.

References

External links
 Marxist writers: G. M. Stekloff

1873 births
1941 deaths
Odesa Jews
Politicians from Odesa
Old Bolsheviks
Communist Party of the Soviet Union members
Soviet historians
Great Purge victims from Ukraine
Jewish socialists
Soviet rehabilitations
Writers from Odesa
Soviet journalists
Soviet newspaper editors
Russian Social Democratic Labour Party members
Soviet publishers (people)
All-Russian Central Executive Committee members
People who died in the Gulag